Therapeutic foods are foods designed for specific, usually nutritional, therapeutic purposes as a form of dietary supplement. The primary examples of therapeutic foods are used for emergency feeding of malnourished children or to supplement the diets of persons with special nutrition requirements, such as the elderly.

Ready-to-use therapeutic food

Composition
Therapeutic foods are usually made of a mixture of protein, carbohydrate, lipid and vitamins and minerals. Therapeutic foods are usually produced by grinding all ingredients together and mixing them. "The mixing process allows for the protein and carbohydrate components of the food to be embedded in the lipid matrix. The size of the particles in the mixture has to be less than 200 μm for the mixture to maintain its consistency. Using this method, the therapeutic food is produced and packaged without using water, which would eliminate the issue of spoilage. Some therapeutic foods require the addition of water before administering, while others can be consumed as-is. Therapeutic foods are designed and manufactured to ensure that they are ready to eat straight from the packaging. Those foods resist bacterial contamination and require no cooking.

A subset of therapeutic foods, ready-to-use therapeutic foods (RUTFs), are energy-dense, micronutrient-enriched pastes that have a nutritional profile similar to the traditional F-100 milk-based diet used in inpatient therapeutic feeding programs and are often made of peanuts, oil, sugar and milk powder.

RUTFs are a "homogeneous mixture of lipid-rich and water-soluble foods." The lipids used in formulating RUTFs are in a viscous liquid form. The other ingredients are in small particles and are mixed through the lipid. The other ingredients are protein, carbohydrate, vitamins and minerals. The mixture needs to be homogeneous for it to be effectively consumed. To do this, a specific mixing process is needed. The fat/lipid component of the RUTF is heated and stirred first. The heat should be maintained for the lipid to remain in the optimum form for mixing in the other ingredients. The powdered protein, carbohydrate, and vitamins and minerals are then slowly and gradually added to the lipid, while the lipid is being vigorously stirred. After all the ingredients are added and vigorous stirring is maintained, the mixture is then stirred with more speed and for several minutes. If the powdered ingredients have a particle size that is larger than 200 μm, the mixture starts to separate; the particle size needs to be maintained at less than 200 μm.

The most common RUTFs are made of four ingredients: sugar, dried skimmed milk, oil, and vitamin and mineral supplement (CMV). Other qualities that RUTFs should have included a texture that is soft or crushable and a taste that is acceptable and suitable for young children. RUTFs should be ready to eat without needing to be cooked. A very important characteristic is that the RUTFs have a long shelf-life and that they are micro-organism contamination resistant, without the need for expensive packaging. Since the ingredients need to be suspended in liquid, the liquid used in producing RUTFs needs to be fat/lipid. 50% of the protein forming RUTFs should come from dairy products.

UNICEF specifications for RUTFs say that the vitamin and mineral premix must be sourced from one of the following vendors authorized by the World Food Program: DSM Nutrition/Fortitech, Nicholas Piramal Healthcare Ltd (now Piramal Group), Hexagon Nutrition, BASF (SternVitamin), and the GAIN premix facility.

RUTFs are used by UNICEF Kid Power malnutrition program, which uses celebrities to go on "global missions" to help save impoverished areas in Africa.

Dietary method
The standard treatment of childhood malnutrition is administered in two phases. Phase one usually deals with children who are severely malnourished and very ill as a result. The therapy used in this phase is F-75, a milk-based liquid food containing modest amounts of energy and protein (75 kcal/100 mL and 0.9 g protein/100 mL) and the administration of parenteral antibiotics. When an improvement in the child's appetite and clinical condition is observed, the child is entered into phase two of the treatment. This phase uses F-100. F-100 is a "specially formulated, high-energy, high-protein (100 kcal/100 mL, 2.9 g protein/100 mL) milk-based liquid food". The child is in phase two until he/she is no longer wasted [weight-for-height z score (WHZ) 2]. Phase two starts while the child is at the hospital but is usually completed after the child goes home. The parent is then responsible for feeding the child a flour supplement made of cereal and legumes as a replacement for the milk-based foods used in phases one and two.

The World Health Organization's standards for the treatment of malnutrition in children specify the use of two formulas during initial treatment, F-75 and F-100. These formulas contain a mixture of powdered milk, sugar, and other ingredients designed to provide an easily absorbed mix of carbohydrates and essential micronutrients. They are generally provided as powdered mixes which are reconstituted with water. The WHO recommends the use of these formulas, with the gradual introduction of other foods, until the child approaches a normal weight.

Effectiveness
Ready to use therapeutic food within the person's own home for the treatment of severe acute malnutrition in children under five years of age may be effective at improving weight gain and recovery when compared to alternative dietary approaches. The effectiveness of ready to use therapeutic food on potential relapses or on overall mortality is not clear.

As of 2013, Plumpy'Nut had been used to relieve malnutrition in thousands of African children, gaining approval as a therapeutic food from the World Health Organization.

Examples

 K-Mix 2, a high energy food, developed by UNICEF in the 1960s
 Citadel spread, a paste of peanuts, oil, sugar and milk powder in use since 1971
 Plumpy'nut, a solid RUTF, made in France since 1996 for treatment of severe acute malnutrition
 Medika Mamba, an enriched peanut butter therapeutic food produced and distributed by Meds and Food for Kids in Haiti since 2003
 BP-100, a nutrient-fortified wheat-and-oat bar designed to provide a similar nutritional profile to F-100 by the World Health Organization
 Nutribun, a fortified bread product developed by United States Agency for International Development and distributed under the Food for Peace program

References

Dietary supplements